Kramgoa låtar 10 is a 1982 Vikingarna studio album. The album was rereleased to CD in 1988 and 1992.

Track listing
Den stora dagen
Skomakaranton
Dance in the Old Fashioned Way
Jag vill va din teddybjörn (Teddy Bear)
Spanish Eyes
San Antonios ros
Under himmel och över öppet hav
Nyanser
Boogie Woogie över stan
En sliten grimma
Det låter knackelibang
Längtan efter solsken
Ett gammalt dragspel
Ge mig vingar som bär mig
Blonda svenska vikingar

Charts

References 

1982 albums
Vikingarna (band) albums
Swedish-language albums